David Anthony Sacco (born July 31, 1970) is an American former professional ice hockey player. Drafted 195th overall by the Toronto Maple Leafs in the 1988 NHL Entry Draft, Sacco played 35 games in the National Hockey League between 1994 and 1996 with the Maple Leafs and Mighty Ducks of Anaheim, scoring a total of 5 goals and 13 assists for 18 points and collecting 22 penalty minutes. He represented the United States as part of the US national ice hockey team at the 1994 Winter Olympics in Lillehammer. He spent one season in Switzerland for SC Bern before retiring.

His older brother Joe Sacco also played in the NHL and is currently an assistant coach with the Boston Bruins. He was born in Malden, Massachusetts and raised in Medford, Massachusetts.

Career statistics

Regular season and playoffs

International

Awards and honors

References

External links
 

1970 births
Living people
American men's ice hockey centers
American people of Italian descent
Baltimore Bandits players
Boston University Terriers men's ice hockey players
Ice hockey players from Massachusetts
Ice hockey players at the 1994 Winter Olympics
Mighty Ducks of Anaheim players
Olympic ice hockey players of the United States
Sportspeople from Malden, Massachusetts
Sportspeople from Medford, Massachusetts
St. John's Maple Leafs players
San Diego Gulls (IHL) players
SC Bern players
Toronto Maple Leafs draft picks
Toronto Maple Leafs players
AHCA Division I men's ice hockey All-Americans